"My Little Girl" is a song that was recorded by The Crickets in 1962 and released on the Liberty label in 1963 (LBF 15089).  This song, which charted at No. 17 in UK, had a similar beat/tempo to the songs "Peggy Sue" and "Peggy Sue Got Married", which had been released earlier, credited to just Buddy Holly instead of Buddy Holly and the Crickets.

Chart performance
The song charted at No. 17 in the United Kingdom in 1963.

1963 singles
1962 songs
Song articles with missing songwriters
The Crickets songs